Up Pops the Devil is a 1931 American pre-Code comedy drama film directed by A. Edward Sutherland. The screenplay concerns an advertising man (Norman Foster) who quits his job to become a novelist, upsetting his wife (Carole Lombard) and straining their marriage.  The film was released by Paramount Pictures. The screenplay is based on a 3-act play of the same name written by Albert Hackett and Frances Goodrich; the play ran on Broadway for 148 performances from September 1930 to January 1931 at the Theatre Masque.

Cast

Richard "Skeets" Gallagher as Biney Hatfield 
Stuart Erwin as Stranger
Carole Lombard as Anne Merrick
Lilyan Tashman as Polly Griscom
Norman Foster as Steve Merrick
Edward J. Nugent as George Kent
Theodore von Eltz as Gilbert Morrell
Joyce Compton as Luella May Carroll
Willie Best as Laundryman 
Eulalie Jensen as Mrs. Kent
Harry Beresford as Mr. Platt
Effie Ellsler as Mrs. Platt
Guy Oliver as Waldo - Handyman

See also
 Thanks for the Memory (1938), a remake of this film starring Bob Hope and Shirley Ross.

References

External links

1931 comedy films
American comedy films
American black-and-white films
American films based on plays
Films directed by A. Edward Sutherland
Paramount Pictures films
1930s English-language films
1930s American films